The 2001 Mr. Olympia contest was an IFBB professional bodybuilding competition held October 26–28, 2001 at the Mandalay Bay Arena in Las Vegas, Nevada.

Results

The total prize money awarded was $400,000

Notable events

Ronnie Coleman won his fourth consecutive Mr. Olympia title
Jay Cutler and Markus Rühl tested positive for banned diuretics however the results were discarded after it was discovered the drug testing laboratory employed by the IFBB was no longer designated as an official accredited lab by the International Olympic Committee

See also
 2001 Ms. Olympia

References

External links 
 Mr. Olympia
 2001 Olympia Weekend coverage

 2001
2001 in American sports
Mr. Olympia 2001
2001 in bodybuilding